Geoffrey Charles Smith, MBE (born 1953) is a British mathematician. He is Senior Lecturer in Mathematics at the University of Bath (where he works in group theory) and current professor in residence at Wells Cathedral School.

He was educated at Trinity School in Croydon, and attended Keble College, Oxford, the University of Warwick, and the University of Manchester, where he gained a Ph.D. in group theory in 1983.

Smith was the leader of the United Kingdom team at the International Mathematical Olympiad between 2002 and 2010, a longer continuous period than any other person.  He returned to the position as leader of the British Mathematical Olympiad from 2013.

Smith oversaw a quantitative increase in training: annual events in Bath (moving to The Queen's College, Oxford, from 2009), at Oundle School, in Hungary, at Trinity College, Cambridge, and immediately prior to the IMO itself. He also thrice won the IMO Golden Microphone, awarded to the national team leader who makes the most speeches to the IMO Jury. In 2010, he was elected to the IMO Advisory Board for a four-year period. Smith was elected as the chair of the International Mathematical Olympiad for the term of 2014-2018 and was re-elected in 2018.

Smith also prepared UK teams for the Romanian Masters in Mathematics tournament (which they won in 2008), and for participation as guests at the annual Balkan Mathematical Olympiad.

As well as group theory, he is also interested in Euclidean geometry. He often collaborates with Christopher Bradley and David Monk, and has published several papers on Forum Geometricorum, the online geometry journal.

In June 2011, Smith was awarded an MBE for services to education following his contributions toward organising Royal Institution Maths Masterclasses.

References

External links 
Virtual Geoff Smith
Geoff Smith on Midweek, 28 January 2004

20th-century English mathematicians
21st-century English mathematicians
Group theorists
Academics of the University of Bath
Alumni of the University of Manchester
1953 births
Living people
Alumni of Keble College, Oxford
Members of the Order of the British Empire